Genesee County is the name of two counties in the United States of America:

Genesee County, Michigan
Genesee County, New York